A Tribute to the Great Nat "King" Cole is the sixth studio album by Marvin Gaye, released on the Tamla (Motown) label on November 1, 1965. It is a tribute album, dedicated to his idol, late jazz performer Nat "King" Cole, who had died of lung cancer earlier in the year.

An Allmusic writer said the album was "a fine album that got lost after its release". Marvin was a vocal admirer of Nat King Cole and told interviewers Cole's vocals and performing style influenced his.

Track listing

Personnel
Marvin Gaye - vocals, possible piano and congas
The Funk Brothers - instrumentation

References

1965 albums
Marvin Gaye albums
Albums produced by Hal Davis
Albums produced by Harvey Fuqua
Albums recorded at Hitsville U.S.A.
Nat King Cole tribute albums
Tamla Records albums